Parliamentary elections were held in Haiti on 12 February 1984. All but one of the candidates were members of the National Unity Party (PUN) of President Jean-Claude Duvalier. The PUN subsequently won all 59 seats.

Results

References

Elections in Haiti
Haiti
1984 in Haiti
One-party elections
Election and referendum articles with incomplete results